is a Japanese composer and arranger. He is noted for composing the soundtracks for several anime series, including the Gorō Taniguchi-directed productions s-CRY-ed, Planetes, Gun Sword, and Code Geass. He provided the music for many of the Kamen Rider and Super Sentai tokusatsu shows and films.

Works

Anime

Tokusatsu

Drama

References

External links
 Official agency profile 
 
 Kotaro Nakagawa profile at Oricon 

1969 births
Anime composers
Japanese composers
Japanese film score composers
Japanese male composers
Japanese male film score composers
Japanese music arrangers
Living people
Tokyo University of the Arts alumni